Parliamentary elections were held in Bulgaria on 7 September 1890. The result was an overwhelming victory for the People's Liberal Party of Prime Minister Stefan Stambolov.

References

Bulgaria
1890 in Bulgaria
Parliamentary elections in Bulgaria
September 1890 events